David Kojo Duku is a Ghanaian politician, teacher and traditional ruler who was a member of the first parliament of the second republic of Ghana representing Aowin constituency under the membership of the progress party (PP).

Early life and education 
David was born on 20 January 1920. He attended Achimota College, where he obtained Teachers' Training Certificate. He later worked as a Teacher and served as a Traditional ruler before going into Parliament in 1969.

Career 
Duku was a teacher by profession. He taught at the Enchi Training College and also served as a Headmaster of the school. He was enstooled divisional chief the Asankra Bremang division of the Wassa Traditional area on 14 February 1965. His stool name was Nana Kofi Animah II.

Politics 
Duku began his political career in 1969 when he became the parliamentary candidate for the Progress Party (PP) to represent the Aowin constituency prior to the commencement of the 1969 Ghanaian parliamentary election.

He was sworn into the First Parliament of the Second Republic of Ghana on 1 October 1969, after being pronounced winner at the 1969 Ghanaian Parliamentary election held on 26 August 1969. His tenure of office as a member of parliament ended on 13 January 1972.

Personal life
Duku was a Christian. He was married with two children. His hobbies were swimming and fishing.

See also 

 List of MPs elected in the 1969 Ghanaian Parliamentary Elections

References 

Ghanaian MPs 1969–1972
1920 births
Possibly living people
Alumni of Achimota School
Progress Party (Ghana) politicians
People from Western Region (Ghana)
Ghanaian Methodists
Ghanaian educators
20th-century Ghanaian politicians
Akan language